Borbotó is a village in the municipality of Valencia, Spain.

Towns in Spain
Populated places in the Province of Valencia
Geography of Valencia